The following is the qualification system and qualified athletes for the beach volleyball at the 2019 Pan American Games competitions.

Qualification system
A total of 64 Beach volleyball athletes will qualify to compete. Each nation may enter a maximum of 4 athletes (one team per gender of two athletes). As host nation, Peru automatically qualified a full team of four athletes (one team per gender). All other quotas were awarded through the NORCECA (North America, Central America and Caribbean) and CSV (South America) rankings. The top 10 teams from NORCECA qualified along with the top five teams from CSV.

Qualification summary

Men

North, Central America and the Caribbean

South America

Peru as host nation qualified automatically

Women

North, Central America and the Caribbean

South America

Peru as host nation qualified automatically

References

P
Qualification for the 2019 Pan American Games
Beach volleyball at the 2019 Pan American Games